Rika Geyser (born 28 August 1978) is a South African rower. She competed in the women's single sculls event at the 2008 Summer Olympics.

References

1978 births
Living people
South African female rowers
Olympic rowers of South Africa
Rowers at the 2008 Summer Olympics
Sportspeople from Pretoria